

The Rhodes Footbridge is an ancient Greek arch bridge in the city of Rhodes, Greece. Dating to the 4th century BC or early Hellenistic period, the modest structure represents the oldest known Greek bridge with a voussoir arch.

Construction and location 
The Rhodes Footbridge was unearthed in 1966−67 close to the eastern harbour of the city of Rhodes, the Akandia Bay. There, an artificial channel of 2.15 m depth ran parallel to the ancient city walls, separated by an 11 m wide street running in between. The sidewalls of the conduit were made of at least four layers of poros limestone blocks, the same material also employed for the arch.

Nearly at its midpoint, the canal is crossed by an 8 m broad arch of wedge-shaped stones which served as a footbridge. The curved opening has a single span of 2.8 m, identical to the width of the canal. Its surprisingly low rise, in the order of 1 to 3−4, gives it the appearance of a segmental or even multi-centered arch, of which it is the only known example in Greek architecture.

While it has been argued that the footbridge remained the only vault bridge in the Greek world, there is—debatable—evidence of at least three more Greek true arch bridges of pre-Roman date.

See also 
 List of Roman bridges

References

Sources

Further reading 
 Bougia, Polyxeni (1996), "Ancient Bridges in Greece and Coastal Asia Minor", Dissertation, University of Pennsylvania

External links 
 Photo of bridge

Ancient bridges in Greece
Deck arch bridges
Stone bridges in Greece
Bridges completed in the 4th century BC
Footbridge
Archaeological sites on Rhodes
4th-century BC establishments in Greece
1960s archaeological discoveries